Psamathocrita is a genus of moth in the family Gelechiidae.

Species
 Psamathocrita albidella (Rebel, 1903)
 Psamathocrita argentella Pierce & Metcalfe, 1942
 Psamathocrita dalmatinella Huemer & Tokár, 2000
 Psamathocrita doloma Bradley, 1965
 Psamathocrita innotatella (Chrétien, 1915)
 Psamathocrita osseella (Stainton, 1861)

References

 
Anomologini